The 2010 Deutsche Tourenwagen Masters was the twenty-fourth season of premier German touring car championship and also eleventh season under the moniker of Deutsche Tourenwagen Masters since the series' resumption in 2000. The season began on 25 April at the Hockenheimring, and ended on 28 November at the Shanghai Street Circuit, after eleven rounds held in Germany, Spain, the Netherlands, the United Kingdom, Italy and China. Having finished second in 2008 and third in 2009, HWA Team's Paul di Resta became champion for the first time, having come out on top of a three-way title battle in Shanghai.

2010 season would be Dunlop's final season as the sole tyre supplier in Deutsche Tourenwagen Masters as the company announced on 19 November 2010 that it would not renew its contract at the end of the season. After several months of deliberation, Hankook was chosen as the tyre supplier for the 2011 season at the Hankook Tire company meeting in Seoul, South Korea on 17 January 2011.

Season summary
Di Resta had trailed teammate Bruno Spengler – a race winner at Lausitz and the Nürburgring – by as many as fifteen points after four races, but by the ninth race, di Resta had taken the championship lead after five top-two finishes including three wins. A poor finish for di Resta at Adria – ninth after being helped into spins by Audi drivers Mike Rockenfeller and Miguel Molina – coupled with Spengler's third place allowed the Canadian driver to take a three-point lead into the final race. Another HWA driver, 2005 season champion Gary Paffett remained in mathematical contention, succeeding in needing a top-two finish at Adria, which left him nine points behind with ten available. Spengler left himself immediately in trouble in Shanghai, crashing during the qualification session which left him 17th on the grid, while di Resta and Paffett lined up on the front row. Spengler could only advance to thirteenth in the race, while his teammates battled for victory. Ultimately, Paffett won the race – ended early due to a collision between Rockenfeller and Susie Stoddart – but di Resta's second place allowed him to take the championship by four points. Paffett's victory also enabled him to overhaul Spengler for second place, by just one point.

Best of the rest went to the defending two-time champion Timo Scheider, who finished as top Audi in fourth place in the championship standings. Scheider, albeit scoring in each of the first five races, struggled for form in the early running, but recovered towards the end of the season and took a single victory during the season, winning at Adria. Mattias Ekström was the only other Audi driver to win a race during the season, winning the series' inaugural race at Valencia but only returned twice to the podium after that; finishing the season in fifth place. Jamie Green was the season's other race-winner, winning for the third season in a row at the Norisring, each of which had been taken in a 2008-specification car. Green finished three points behind Ekström, in sixth place in the points standings.

Rule changes for 2010
 With the championship undergoing a development freeze until the 2011 season, teams will use 2008 and 2009 cars only.

Teams and drivers
The following manufacturers, teams and drivers competed in the 2010 Deutsche Tourenwagen Masters. All teams competed with tyres supplied by Dunlop.

Driver Changes
Changed Teams
 Oliver Jarvis: Team Phoenix → Abt Sportsline
 Katherine Legge: Abt Sportsline → Team Rosberg
 Mike Rockenfeller: Team Rosberg → Team Phoenix

Entering DTM
 Congfu Cheng: A1 Grand Prix (A1 Team China) → Persson Motorsport
 David Coulthard: Sabbatical → Mücke Motorsport
 Miguel Molina: Formula Renault 3.5 Series (Ultimate Motorsport) → Abt Sportsline
 Darryl O'Young: World Touring Car Championship (bamboo-engineering) → Team Phoenix

Leaving DTM
 Christian Bakkerud: Kolles Futurecom-TME → 24 Hours of Le Mans (Kolles)
 Tomáš Kostka: Kolles Futurecom-BRT → Auto GP (Charouz-Gravity Racing)
 Tom Kristensen: Abt Sportsline → DTM retirement; Sportscars only.
 Mathias Lauda: Mücke Motorsport → Porsche Supercup (Porsche AG)
 Johannes Seidlitz: Kolles Futurecom-BRT → FIA GT3 European Championship (Team Rosberg)

Race calendar and results
 A nine-round calendar was announced on 18 December 2009. This was later expanded to ten races, with the addition of a street race in Shanghai, China that was announced on 28 January 2010. This race closed the season on 28 November. On 15 July 2010, it was announced that an additional round would take place on 31 October at Adria; returning to the circuit which held races in 2003 and 2004.

Championship standings

Drivers' championship

† — Driver retired, but was classified as they completed 90% of the winner's race distance.

Teams' championship

References

External links
 The official website of the Deutsche Tourenwagen Masters

Deutsche Tourenwagen Masters seasons
Deutsche Tourenwagen Masters